Muhammad Ridhuan bin Muhammad (born 6 May 1984) is a former Singaporean professional footballer who played in the Singapore Premier League and Liga 1 as a defender and occasionally winger.

Club career
Ridhuan started playing football at the Milo Soccer School. Ridhuan was part of the pioneer batch at the National Football Academy that was set up in 2000.

Young Lions 
Ridhuan started his career with S.League clubs Young Lions. First catching the eye for the national U18 team with his speed and mazy dribbling skills, he joined the Young Lions for the 2003 S.League season.

Tampines Rovers 
In 2007, Tampines Rovers head coach Vorawan Chitavanich offered Ridhuan to play at Tampines Rovers which he accepted.

Arema Malang 
In 2009, Ridhuan was in the midst of discussion with Indonesian club Persib Bandung when fellow national footballer, Noh Alam Shah, invited him to join Arema F.C. Ridhuan eventually signed with Arema and spent three and a half season with Arema and helped Arema to win the 2009-2010 Indonesian Super League title.

In 2003, Ridhuan also spent half a season on loan at Putra Samarinda. He was wildly popular during his time in Indonesia and was often referred to as R6, a moniker of Cristiano Ronaldo's CR7.

Due to a possible ban by FIFA on football activities in Indonesia, Ridhuan left the club and returned to Singapore.

Geylang International 
With a FIFA ban looming on all Indonesian footballing activities, he moved back to Singapore with Geylang International after his 4-year sojourn.

Tampines Rovers 
Following his release by Tampines Rovers at the conclusion of the 2015 S.League season, Ridhuan announced his retirement from football to forge a new career in the oil and gas industry following his failure to secure a contract.

Warriors FC 
However, the speedy winger was snapped up by Warriors FC just before the start of the 2016 S.League season and made his debut as a substitute in a 3–1 loss against Brunei DPMM. He scored his first goal of the season in a 2–2 draw against Geylang International to rescue a point for the Warriors after coming on as a substitute. He repaid the faith that the Warriors had shown him by accumulating a total of four goals and six assists in all competitions. His performances for the Warriors was rewarded with a contract extension for the 2017 S.League season.

Borneo FC
Ridhuan planned to end his footballing career in Indonesia and signed a one month deal with Borneo FC in early 2018 to participate in a tournament. After his contract ended, Warriors FC contacted Ridhuan to sign him back to the club but was rejected by him.

Tanjong Pagar United
On 13 January 2021, Tanjong Pagar United has announced that they have signed Ridhuan for the 2021 season. This marks him coming out of retirement from football since 2018. On 10 October 2021, Ridhuan retired from football after a season with the Jaguars, making four appearances for the club.

Managerial career

Tanjong Pagar United U15
On 28 December 2021, Tanjong Pagar United has announced that Ridhuan will be a part of the coaching team. He will coach the club’s U15 team.

International career
While Ridhuan did not feature much in the league, Singapore coach Radojko Avramović saw something in the talented youngster and gave him his international debut against Qatar on 19 November 2003.

With midfielder Shahril Ishak, defender Baihakki Khaizan and keeper Hassan Sunny, he is part of the 'NFA Gang of Four', the quartet which has played together since their early teenage years and earned senior international honours in 2003.

He was also part of the national side that won the 2004 AFF Championship albeit only featuring in the opening game. Three years later in the 2007 AFF Championship, he played a major role in the team's success in retaining the championship.

As of December 2017, Ridhuan has amassed 68 caps for Singapore.

Personal life
Ridhuan went to Hong Kah Primary and Secondary School. Apart from playing football, he owns a home based barber service called 1E_Xpress. Amongst his clients was his former lions teammates Baihakki Khaizan, Khairul Amri, Noh Alam Shah and Shahril Ishak.

National team career statistics

Goals for Senior National Team
Scores and results list Nigeria's goal tally first.

Honours

Club
Arema Indonesia
Indonesia Super League: 2009–10

Warriors
Singapore FA Cup: 2017

International
Singapore
AFF Championship: 2004, 2007

References

External links

Fas.org

Living people
1984 births
Singaporean footballers
Singapore international footballers
Association football midfielders
Tampines Rovers FC players
Geylang International FC players
Expatriate footballers in Indonesia
Singapore Premier League players
Indonesian Super League-winning players
Liga 1 (Indonesia) players
Young Lions FC players
Singaporean expatriate footballers
Singaporean expatriate sportspeople in Indonesia
Singaporean people of Malay descent
Footballers at the 2006 Asian Games
Southeast Asian Games bronze medalists for Singapore
Southeast Asian Games medalists in football
Competitors at the 2007 Southeast Asian Games
Asian Games competitors for Singapore